Mehrabad (also Romanized as Mehrābād) is a village in Kuhsar Rural District, in the Central District of Khansar County, Isfahan Province, Iran. At the 2006 census, its population was 119, in 43 families.

References 

Populated places in Khansar County